Reservations for Two is a studio album by the American singer Dionne Warwick. It was recorded during the spring of 1987 and released on July 30 of that year. Her eighth album for Arista Records, it was again executive produced by label head Clive Davis. Warwick reteamed with Barry Manilow and the duo Burt Bacharach and Carole Bayer Sager to work on the album, while Kashif, Jerry Knight, Howard Hewett and Smokey Robinson also contributed to the tracks.

Upon release, Reservations for Two peaked at number 57 on the US Billboard 200 and entered the top 20 of the Swedish Albums Chart, peaking at number 14. Its release was preceded by the lead single "Love Power," a duet with Jeffrey Osborne, which reached number 12 on the Billboard Hot 100 and number one on the Adult Contemporary chart. It was followed by the title track, which entered the top 20 on the Hot R&B/Hip-Hop Songs chart.

Track listing

Personnel and credits 
Musicians

 Dionne Warwick – lead vocals, backing vocals (6, 10)
 Greg Phillinganes – keyboards (1, 6, 8), synthesizers (6), Rhodes (10)
 David Foster – synthesizers (1)
 Burt Bacharach – additional synthesizer (1), synthesizers (4)
 Robbie Buchanan – additional synthesizer (1)
 David Boruff – synthesizer programming (1), saxophone solo (4)
 Jerry Knight – all instruments except drums and percussion (tracks 2, 5, 7), musical bridge arrangements (2)
 Aaron Zigman – all instruments except drums and percussion (tracks 2, 5, 7), musical bridge arrangements (2)
 Reginald "Sonny" Burke – keyboards (3)
 William Bryant – synthesizers (3)
 Randy Kerber – keyboards (4), synthesizers (8)
 Michael Boddicker – synthesizers (4)
 Kashif – keyboards (6, 9), synthesizers (6, 9), drums (6), percussion (6), lead and backing vocals (6), rhythm arrangements (6, 9), synthesizer programming (9), bass (9)
 Larry Williams – synthesizer programming (6), saxophone solo (7)
 Fred Zarr – keyboards (9), synthesizers (9), rhythm arrangements (9)
 Jeff Smith – synthesizer programming (9)
 Artie Butler – acoustic piano (10), orchestration (10), musical arrangements (10)
 Dann Huff – guitar (1, 4, 6, 8)
 Ira Siegel – guitar (9)
 Charles Fearing – guitar (10)
 Nathan East – bass (1, 3, 6, 8)
 Neil Stubenhaus – bass (4, 10)
 Carlos Vega – drums (1, 8)
 John Robinson – drums (2, 4, 5, 7)
 Ed Greene – drums (3, 10)
 Paul Leim – drums (6, 9)
 Paulinho da Costa – percussion (2, 5, 7, 9)
 Bashiri Johnson – percussion (6)
 Alan Estes – percussion (track 10)
 Kenny G – alto saxophone solo (1)
 David Majal Li – saxophone (3)
 Gene Page – arrangements (3), string and horn arrangements (6)
 Barry Manilow – musical arrangements (10)
 Jeffrey Osborne – lead vocals (1)
 Tim Feehan – backing vocals (1, 4)
 Joe Pizzulo – backing vocals (1, 4)
 Kevin Dorsey – backing vocals (2)
 James Ingram – backing vocals (2)
 David Lasley – backing vocals (2)
 Phil Perry – backing vocals (2)
 Smokey Robinson – lead vocals (3)
 Patricia Henley – backing vocals (3)
 Robert Henley – backing vocals (3)
 Alfie Silas – backing vocals (3)
 Howard Smith – backing vocals (3)
 Ivory Stone – backing vocals (3)
 Howard Hewett – lead vocals (5)
 Yogi Lee – backing vocals (6)
 June Pointer – lead vocals (8)
 Tommy Funderburk – backing vocals (10)
 Tom Kelly – backing vocals (10)
 Richard Page – backing vocals (10)

Production

 Clive Davis – executive producer
 Burt Bacharach – producer (1, 4, 8)
 Carole Bayer Sager – producer (1, 4, 8)
 Jerry Knight – producer (2, 5, 7)
 Aaron Zigman – producer (2, 5, 7)
 Smokey Robinson – producer (3), mixing (3)
 Kashif – producer (6, 9)
 Barry Manilow – producer (10)
 Michael DeLugg – associate producer (10), engineer (10)
 Mick Guzauski – engineer (1, 4, 8), mixing (1, 2, 4, 5, 7, 8)
 Daren Klein – additional engineer (1, 4, 8), engineer (2, 5, 7), mixing (3)
 Tommy Vicari – additional engineer (1)
 Marnie Riley – assistant engineer (1, 8)
 Gary Wagner – assistant engineer (1, 8)
 Russ Terrana – engineer (3), additional engineer (6)
 Darroll Gustamachio – engineer and mixing (6, 9)
 Calvin Harris – additional engineer (6)
 John Dranchak – assistant engineer (6, 9)
 Steve James – assistant engineer (6)
 Bob Loftus – assistant engineer (6)
 Steve MacMillan – assistant engineer (6)
 Larry Smith – assistant engineer (6, 9)
 Bill Jackson – assistant engineer (10)
 Tom Nist – assistant engineer (10)
 Bernie Grundman – mastering at Bernie Grundman Mastering (Hollywood, California).
 Frank DeCaro – musical contractor (1, 4, 8)
 Russell Sidelsky – production coordinator (6, 9)
 Eric Borenstein – project coordinator (10)
 Marc Hulett – assistant to Barry Manilow (10)
 Maude Gilman – art direction
 Ann Petter – design
 Harry Langdon – photography
 Clifford Peterson – hairdresser
 Luiz Archer – fashion stylist
 Wynona Price – make-up

Charts

References

External links
Reservations for Two at Discogs

1987 albums
Dionne Warwick albums
albums arranged by Gene Page
Albums produced by Clive Davis
Albums produced by Burt Bacharach
Albums produced by Smokey Robinson
Arista Records albums